Marco Miroldi, O.P. (died 1495) was a Roman Catholic prelate who served as Archbishop of Reggio Calabria (1491–1495).

Biography
Marco Miroldi was ordained a priest in the Order of Preachers.
On 4 January 1491, he was appointed during the papacy of Pope Innocent VIII as Archbishop of Reggio Calabria.
He served as Archbishop of Reggio Calabria until his death in 1495.

References

External links and additional sources
 (for Chronology of Bishops) 
 (for Chronology of Bishops) 

15th-century Roman Catholic archbishops in the Kingdom of Naples
Bishops appointed by Pope Innocent VIII
1495 deaths
Dominican bishops